Miopelobates is an extinct genus of prehistoric frogs in the family Pelobatidae.

See also
 Prehistoric amphibian
 List of prehistoric amphibians

References

Prehistoric frogs
Fossil taxa described in 1955
Taxa named by Otto von Wettstein